Dekha Hela Prema Hela is a 2019 Odia language romantic film directed by T Ganesh written by Ajay Samal. Starring Subhasis Sharma, Avisekh Rath, and Ragini Sutradhar in the lead roles.

Cast
 Subhasis Sharma
 Avisekh Rath
 Ragini Sutradhar
 Pradyumna Lenka
 Pratibha Panda
 Jojo

Soundtrack

Music composed by S Chandrakanta. The soundtrack was released by Cine 24.

References

External links 
 
  on Movie buff
 

2019 films
2010s Odia-language films